Anchylobela haplodes is a species of snout moth described by Alfred Jefferis Turner in 1947. It is known from Queensland, Australia.

References

Moths described in 1947
Anerastiini
Moths of Australia